Cam's Delight was built in Fareham (Portsmouth) in 1741. Although she spent some years trading with Africa, she spent most of her career as a coaster. She may have made occasional voyages further afield. She was wrecked in 1838, after having sailed for some 97 years.

Career
Cam's Delight first appeared in Lloyd's Register (LR) in 1782 with W. Morris, master, Ireland & Co., owners, trade Guernsey–Bristol. She had undergone a thorough repair in 1775. 

Capture and recapture: Lloyd's List (LL) reported on 13 September 1782 that a French privateer had captured Cam's Delight off Land's End and sent her to France. Cam's Delight, Morris, master, had been sailing from Bristol to Portsmouth. The next issue of LL reported that she had been retaken and brought into Portsmouth. An alternate report was that a French squadron had captured her but then had given her up.

Cam's Delight then disappeared from LR for some years. Still, a 1789 guide to Bristol listed Cam's Delight, Morris, master, as a constant trader between Bristol and Portsmouth.

Cam's Delight reentered LR in 1798 with G[eorge] Smyth, master, S.Teast, owner, and trade Bristol–Africa. She had undergone a good repair and lengthening in 1798. Although the Bristol–Africa trade usually signaled the slave trade, she was apparently not a slave ship.

In late April or early May 1815, Captain Roberts ran Cam's Delight ashore at Seacombe, Cheshire because she was very leaky. She was on a voyage from Dublin to Liverpool.

Loss
However, her crew had been saved.

Notes

Citations

References
 
 

1741 ships
Ships built in Portsmouth
Age of Sail merchant ships of England
Maritime incidents in 1815
Maritime incidents in March 1838